Chihua Street is the western terminus of Line 4 of the Hangzhou Metro in China. It is located in the Xihu District of Hangzhou. It was opened on 21 February 2022.

References 

Railway stations in Zhejiang
Railway stations in China opened in 2022
Hangzhou Metro stations